Ivane II Jaqeli (1370 – 1444) was a Georgian prince (mtavari) and longest-reigning Atabeg of Samtskhe from 1391 to 1444. His father was Beka II, the great-grandson of Beka I Jaqeli. In 1395, after Aghbugha I's death Ivane took an absolute power. Ivane was an energetic ruler. In 1390s he was fighting against Tamerlane to defend Meskhetian lands, but in 1400 economically weakened Ivane surrendered to the Turco-Mongolian forces. In early 1410s Ivane created separatist factions against Bagrationi dynasty. He wanted to gain independence for the Meskhetian church, but faced opposition of Georgian clergy. In 1414 King Alexander I had defeated Ivane II at the battle of Aspindza. Atabeg was captured by royal servants. By the order of King he committed the oath of allegiance and returned to his throne. In his last years elderly Ivane had left most of the powers of Principality in the hands of his two sons, Aghbugha and Qvarqvare.

References

House of Jaqeli
Atabegs of Samtskhe
14th-century people from Georgia (country)
15th-century people from Georgia (country)
Military personnel from Georgia (country)
1444 deaths
1370 births